Caravan of Dreams was a performing arts center in the central business district of Fort Worth, Texas during the 1980s and 1990s. The venue was best known locally as a live music nightclub, though this was only one part of a larger facility. The center also included a multitrack recording studio, a 212-seat theater, two dance studios, and a rooftop garden. The center was at 312 Houston Street, and prefigured the redevelopment of Sundance Square into a dining and entertainment district. Billionaire oil heir Ed Bass, whose family has participated in much of the redevelopment of downtown Fort Worth, financed the project, and Kathelin Hoffman served as its artistic director.  The facility consisted of new construction behind two facades from the 1880s.

History 
Caravan of Dreams was self-described as "...a meeting place appealing to audiences who enjoy the creation of new forms of music, theater, dance, poetry and film," designed and managed by and for artists. The name was taken from 1001 Arabian Nights, by way of Brion Gysin, who attended the opening of the venue with William S. Burroughs in 1983. The opening celebration centered around performances by Fort Worth native Ornette Coleman, both with his Prime Time ensemble in the nightclub, and with the Fort Worth Symphony at the nearby Convention Center. The event coincided with the mayoral proclamation of September 29, 1983 as "Ornette Coleman Day," when Coleman was presented with a key to the city.

Caravan of Dreams hosted many musical acts in its time, including David Sanborn and Nancy Wilson, among many others.

The center operated its own record label,  releasing albums by Coleman as well as artists such as Ronald Shannon Jackson, James Blood Ulmer, and Twins Seven Seven. Caravan of Dreams also released films (including Ornette: Made in America, a feature-length documentary about Coleman) and spoken word recordings by William S. Burroughs, Brion Gysin, John P. Allen (as Johnny Dolphin), and others.  The label was active for about five years.

The rooftop garden featured hundreds of cacti and succulent plants, as well as a glass geodesic dome. Several years later, Biosphere 2 would incorporate geodesic domes in its structure, with the involvement of some of the same individuals behind Caravan of Dreams.

Eventually the facility became less geared toward the experimental (though high-profile) musicians, writers, and artists with whom it was associated in its early days. Caravan of Dreams ceased its production of entertainment media, and the nightclub hosted more mainstream performers outside of the jazz genre.

Frequent headliners Acoustic Alchemy named a track on their fourth album, Reference Point, after the venue.

Peter White's 1996 album and title track were named after the venue.

The nightclub closed in 2001 (with Brave Combo as the closing night act), exactly eighteen years after Ornette Coleman Day, and was converted into a restaurant, Reata at Sundance Square. Four Day Weekend, a comedy troupe, began performing in the theater before the nightclub closed, and continued operating the space as Four Day Weekend Theater.

Discography

See also 
 List of jazz clubs
 List of record labels

Notes and references

External links
Caravan of Dreams at fortwortharchitecture.com - About the structure that housed the venue (includes photos).

Buildings and structures in Fort Worth, Texas
Culture of Fort Worth, Texas
Jazz clubs in the United States
Record labels disestablished in 1990
Jazz record labels
Economy of Fort Worth, Texas
1983 establishments in Texas 
2001 disestablishments in Texas 
Defunct jazz clubs in the United States
Music venues completed in 1983